George Handley (1868–1938) was an English footballer who played in the Football League for Derby County and Notts County.

References

1868 births
1938 deaths
English footballers
Association football forwards
English Football League players
Loughborough F.C. players
Notts County F.C. players
Derby County F.C. players
Coalville Town F.C. players
Northampton Town F.C. players
Newark Town F.C. players